Anagennisi Deryneia is Cypriot football team based in Deryneia, Famagusta. The club was founded in 1920 and they joined the Cyprus Football Association in 1972. The team played in the Cypriot First division in 2011 but was relegated at the end of the season. It has participated in the first and second divisions and Cypriot Third Division in the past. The club also maintains a volleyball team, which is currently playing in the Second Division, having lifted the Cypriot Cup trophy twice in the past.

Supporters
Anagennisis Derynia's supporters are really passionate and cheerful at all the club's matches. The official fan club of Anagennisis is called TIFIOZI and it was established in 2009.

Players

Out on loan

For recent transfers, see List of Cypriot football transfers summer 2021

Technical and medical staff

League History
2009–10
Anagennisis finished in 3rd position in the Cypriot Third Division and gained promotion to the Second Division.

2010–11
Anagennisis finished in 3rd position in the Cypriot Second Division and gained promotion to First Division.

2011–12
Anagennisis finished in 13th position in the Cypriot First Division and was relegated to Second Division.

2012–13
Anagennisis finished in 4th position in the Cypriot Second Division.

2013–14
Anagennisis finished in 3rd position in the Cypriot Second division.

Honours

Football
Cypriot Second Division: 2
1998–99, 2002–03

Managers
 Anatoly Baidachny (1992–93)
 Adamos Adamou (Aug 2009 – April 12, 2014)
 Nikos Nikolaou (June 19, 2014 – Feb 7, 2015)
 Adamos Adamou (June 6, 2015– Oct 23, 2016)
 Savvas Poursaitides (Oct 25, 2016–)

External links
 Official Website
 Facebook Page

References

 
Football clubs in Cyprus
Volleyball clubs in Cyprus
Association football clubs established in 1920
1920 establishments in Cyprus